Jazz Party is a 1959 album by Duke Ellington and His Orchestra which contains a "formidable gallery of jazz stars" guesting, including Dizzy Gillespie and Jimmy Rushing (formerly the vocalist for Count Basie). It featured also a 9-strong percussion section on two tracks.
 
The recording was first digitally remixed by Larry Keyes and remastered by Vlado Meller in 1987 and released on CD in the "CBS Jazz Masterpieces" series. A new remastering by Bernie Grundman in the early 2000s was first issued by Mobile Fidelity Sound Lab.

Critical reception

Described as "an example of the ever-surprising repertoire...characteristic of late Ellington", Jazz Party has been praised particularly for its unique percussion pieces. Village Voice reviewer Gary Giddins stated that the percussion song "Malletoba Spank" "will rattle in your brain until you die". The multi-part "Toot Suite" has been described as intriguing, though underrated, featuring strong statements from Ellington regulars and guests. Dizzy Gillespie's guest solo on "U.M.M.G." attracts much attention as well, and has been labeled both "enterprising" and "inspired".

Track listing

"Satin Doll" and "Fillie Trillie" are included on the Columbia reissues, not on the original LP, nor on the Mobile Fidelity CD release.

Personnel

Performance

Cat Anderson – Trumpet
Shorty Baker – Trumpet
Ray Nance – Trumpet
Clark Terry – Trumpet
Andres Ford – Trumpet
Quentin Jackson – Trombone
Britt Woodman – Trombone
John Sanders – Valve trombone
Jimmy Hamilton – Clarinet, tenor saxophone
Johnny Hodges – Alto saxophone
Russell Procope – Clarinet, alto saxophone
Paul Gonsalves – Tenor saxophone
Harry Carney – Baritone saxophone
Duke Ellington – Piano
Jimmy Woode – Bass
Sam Woodyard – Drums

Guests
Dizzy Gillespie – Trumpet on "U.M.M.G." and "Hello Little Girl"
Jimmy Jones – Piano on "Hello Little Girl"
Jimmy Rushing – Vocals on "Hello Little Girl"
Percussion section on "Malletoba Spank" and "Tymperturbably Blue"
Elden C. Bailey – percussion
Harry Breuer – Percussion
George Gaber – Percussion
Morris Goldenberg – Percussion
Chauncey Morehouse – Percussion
Walter Rosenberg – Percussion
Bobby Rosengarden – Percussion
Milton Schlesinger – Percussion
Brad Spinney – Percussion

Production
Irving Townsend – producer, liner notes
Larry Keyes – digital remix (1987)
Vlado Meller - remastering (1987)
Bernie Grundman - remastering (early 2000s)
Amy Herot – production coordination

References

Duke Ellington albums
1959 albums
Albums produced by Irving Townsend
Columbia Records albums
Albums recorded at CBS 30th Street Studio